Large format refers to any imaging format of  or larger.

The main advantage of a large format, film or digital, is a higher resolution at the same pixel pitch, or the same resolution with larger pixels or grains which allows each pixel to capture more light enabling exceptional low-light capture. A 4×5 inch image (12.903 mm²) has about 15 times the area, and thus 15× the total resolution, of a 35 mm frame (864 mm²).

Large format cameras were some of the earliest photographic devices, and before enlargers were common, it was normal to just make 1:1 contact prints from a 4×5, 5×7, or 8×10-inch negative.

Formats
The most common large format is 4×5 inches (10.2x12.7 cm), which was the size used by cameras like the Graflex Speed Graphic and Crown Graphic, among others. Less common formats include quarter-plate (3.25x4.25 inches (8.3x10.8 cm)), 5×7 inches (12.7x17.8 cm), and 8×10 inches (20×25 cm); the size of many old 1920s Kodak cameras (various versions of Kodak 1, 2, and 3 and Master View cameras, to much later Sinar monorail studio cameras) are 11×14 inches (28x36 cm), 16×20 inches (41x51 cm), 20×24 inches (51x61 cm), various panoramic or "banquet" formats (such as 4×10 and 8×20 inches (10x25 and 20x51 cm), and metric formats, including 9×12 cm, 10×13 cm, and 13×18 cm and assorted old and current aerial image formats of 9×9 inches, 9×18 inches (K17, K18, K19, K22 etc.), using roll film of 4, 5, 6, 7, 9, or 10 inches width or, view cameras (including pinhole cameras), reproduction/process cameras, and x-ray film.

Above 8×10 inches, the formats are often referred to as Ultra Large Format (ULF) and may be 11×14, 16×20, or 20×24 inches or as large as film, plates, or cameras are available. Many large formats (e.g., 24×24, 36x36, and 48x48 inches) are horizontal cameras designed to make big negatives for contact printing onto press-printing plates.

The Polaroid 20×24 camera is one of the largest format instant cameras in common usage and can be hired from Polaroid agents in various countries.

Control

Most, but not all, large format cameras are view cameras, with fronts and backs called "standards" that allow the photographer to better control rendering of perspective and increase apparent depth of field. Architectural and close-up photographers in particular benefit greatly from this ability. These allow the front and back of the camera to be shifted up/down and left/right (useful for architectural images where the scene is higher than the camera, and produces images where the scene is lower than the camera), and tilted out of parallel with each other left/right, up/down, or both; based on the Scheimpflug principle. The shift and tilt movements make it possible to solve otherwise impossible depth-of-field problems, and to change perspective rendering, and create special effects that would be impossible with a conventional fixed-plane fixed-lens camera.

Ansel Adams' photographs, and those of the other Group f/64 photographers, demonstrate how the use of front (lens plane) and back (film plane) adjustments can secure great apparent depth of field when using the movements available on large format view cameras.

Operation
A number of actions need to be taken to use a typical large format camera, resulting in a slower, often more contemplative, photographic style. For example, film loading using sheet film holders requires a dark space to load and unload the film, typically a changing bag or darkroom, although prepackaged film magazines and large format roll films have also been used in the past.

A tripod is typically used for view camera work, but some models are designed for hand-held use. These "technical cameras" have separate viewfinders and rangefinders for faster handling.

In general large format camera use, the scene is composed on the camera's ground glass, and then a film holder is fitted to the camera back prior to exposure. A separate Polaroid back using instant film is used by some photographers, allowing previewing of the composition, correctness of exposure and depth of field before committing the image to film to be developed later. Failure to "Polaroid" an exposure risks discovery later, at the time of film development, that there was an error in camera setup.

Uses

The 4×5 inch sheet film format was very convenient for press photography since it allowed for direct contact printing on the printing plate, hence it was widely used in press cameras. This was done well into the 1940s and 1950s, even with the advent of more convenient and compact medium format or 35 mm roll-film cameras which started to appear in the 1930s. The 35 mm and medium format SLR which appeared in the mid-1950s were soon adopted by press photographers.

Large format photography is not limited to film; large digital camera backs are available to fit large format cameras. These are either medium-format digital backs adapted to fit large format cameras (sometimes resulting in cropped images), step and repeat Multishot systems, or scanning backs (which scan the image area in the manner of a flat-bed scanner). Scanning backs can take seconds or even several minutes to capture an image. When using a Sinar Macroscan unit and 54H data files, over 1 gigabyte of data is produced.

Large format, both film-based and digital, is still used for many applications, such as landscape photography, advertising photos, fine-art photography, scientific applications and generally for images that will be enlarged to a high magnification while requiring a high level of detail. High quality fine art prints can be made at sizes in the range of 40x50″ from a 4×5″ original, and well beyond that for larger negatives.

The Library of Congress uses various large format digital scans for "American Memories" (its website of old images and maps) in the current JPEG 2000 format (which allows quick small images, remote tiling, remote enlargement), and the older MrSID, JPEG, and TIFF formats.

In the printing industry, very large fixed cameras were also used to make large films for the preparation of lithographic plates before computer to film and computer to plate techniques were introduced. These are generally referred to as a "process camera" and consist of vertically mounted models for smaller work and horizontal units mounted on rails for very large works such as maps and plans.

National Park Service documentation programs
Large format film is also used to create a record of historic places and things for the National Park Service documentation programs. The Historic American Buildings Survey (HABS), the Historic American Engineering Record (HAER), and the Historic American Landscapes Survey (HALS) require large format film-based photography. 4×5″, 5×7″, and 8×10″ large format film formats are the only acceptable formats for inclusion in these collections at the Library of Congress. 4x5 and 5x7 are generally used in the field (5×7″ is preferred for very significant buildings) and 8×10″ is generally utilized for photo-duplication of historic photographs, documents and blueprints. Through HABS/HAER/HALS, buildings and sites of historic significance are recorded with large format cameras and black and white film and using techniques that document the key features of the historic resource with special care not to distort the angles and views. This rectified photography can be accomplished with large format cameras by keeping the film, lens and subject perfectly parallel. Smaller format cameras need to be tilted to view high or low subjects, but the same subjects can be captured by shifting the lens element of a large format camera up or down to keep the film, lens, and subject planes parallel.

HABS, HAER, and HALS also requires the increased resolution of large format film. A sheet of 5×7″ film has almost twice the resolution of 4×5″ film, and 4×5″ is almost 16 times larger than a 35 mm film image (24×36 mm). This added negative size not only allows for more detail, but the large format polyester film is also far more durable than acetate 35 mm stock. HABS, HAER, and HALS require that all submissions to the Library of Congress include the original film (archivally washed) and it must also include contact prints on fiber-based paper; these contacts are the same size as the film being submitted, 4×5″, 5×7″, or 8×10″, and the large size allows people to readily see the prints, while 35 mm contacts would be too small and would require magnification.

Photographers noted for having used large format

 Ansel Adams
 Robert Adams
 Takashi Amano (8×20" and 11×14")
 Eugène Atget
 Richard Avedon
 Tina Barney
 Gabriele Basilico
 Bernd and Hilla Becher
 Margaret Bourke-White
 Marilyn Bridges
 Richard Bryant
 Christopher Burkett
 Edward Burtynsky
 Clyde Butcher
 Julia Margaret Cameron
 Keith Carter
 Paul Caponigro
 Chuck Close (20×24", 40×80")
 Anne Collier
 Linda Connor
 Thomas Joshua Cooper
 Gregory Crewdson
 Rineke Dijkstra
 Elsa Dorfman (20"×24")
 William Eggleston
 Mitch Epstein
 Walker Evans
 Andreas Feininger
 Miguel Gómez
 Emmet Gowin
 Peter Gowland
 Timothy Greenfield-Sanders
 Olivier Grunewald
 Guido Guidi (8×10")
 Andreas Gursky (5×7")
 Milton Halberstadt
 Charles "Teenie" Harris
 Evelyn Hofer (4×5")
 Yousuf Karsh (8×10")
 Seydou Keïta
 Mark Klett
 Nick Knight (8×10")
 An-My Lê (8×10")
 Herman Leonard
 Sze Tsung Leong
 O. Winston Link
 Rodney Lough Jr.
 Janelle Lynch (8x10")
 Sally Mann
 George Masa
 Louis Mendes
 Joel Meyerowitz (8×10")
 Richard Misrach
 Andrea Modica (8x10")
 David Muench
 Nicholas Nixon (8×10")
 Eliot Porter
 Mark Power
 Judith Joy Ross
 Paolo Roversi
 Thomas Ruff
 John Sexton
 Stephen Shore
 Julius Shulman
 Michael A. Smith (8×10", 8×20" and 18×22")
 Alec Soth
 David Stephenson (photographer)
 Joel Sternfeld
 Ezra Stoller
 Paul Strand
 Thomas Struth
 Hiroshi Sugimoto
 George Tice
 Arthur Tress
 Brian Ulrich
 Jeff Wall
 Peter Watson
 Weegee (4×5")
 William Wegman
 Brett Weston
 Edward Weston

See also
 APUG
 Large format lens
 Reisekamera (tailboard view camera)
 Wide-format printer (In digital printing, the term "large format" is also used as a synonym for "wide format".)

References

External links

HABS/HAER/HALS Standards & Guidelines, National Park Service website

Film formats